Warton is a civil parish in Lancaster, Lancashire, England. It contains 29 listed buildings that are recorded in the National Heritage List for England.  Of these, two are listed at Grade I, the highest of the three grades, and the others are at Grade II, the lowest grade.  The parish contains the village of Warton and surrounding countryside.  Most of the listed buildings are houses or farmhouses, the majority being on Main Street in the village.  The Lancaster Canal runs through the parish, and a flight of locks is listed.  The other listed buildings include a ruined rectory, a church, a public house, a milestone, and a disused limekiln.

Key

Buildings

References

Citations

Sources

Lists of listed buildings in Lancashire
Buildings and structures in the City of Lancaster